The Malhar also known as Panbhare is a Subcaste of the Koli caste found in the Indian states of Gujarat, Maharashtra, Goa and Karnataka. The Malhar Kolis used to work as Yeskar and they were Subedar or fortkeeper of Sinhagad, Torna and Rajgad forts during time of Shivaji. Their local traditional dance is Tarpa Dance in Maharashtra. they worship the Waghowa devi which is a lion goddess.

The Malhar Kolis are hereditary priest in the Mahalaxmi temple of Dahanu which was built by king Jayaba Mukne of Jawhar State in 1343.

Origin and distribution 
The name of Malhar Kolis is probably derived from either (i) the Dravidian word 'Mala' meaning hill or (ii) from a description of the tribe as 'Kolis worshiping the god Malhar.

Malhar Kolis is mainly concentrated in Palghar, Dahanu, Wada, Jawhar, Vasai, and Bhivandi tehsils of the Thane district of Maharashtra.

Clans 
Here are some of the clans of Malhar Kolis:

 Barad
 Babar
 Bodle
 Balshi
 Bhoye
 Basvant
 Bhoir
 Bhomte
 Bhavar
 Chakar
 Dalvi
 Dumade
 Dongarkar
 Dhangade
 Dhapasti
 Ghatal
 Gadag
 Golim
 Gavade
 Gahade
 Hadal
 Harke
 Jadhav
 Jimbal
 Kharpade
 Karmode
 Kathe
 Katar
 Kamadi
 Khatali
 Kirkire
 Lade
 Lilke
 Mali
 Mor
 Morghe
 Matera
 Madake
 Narale
 Patara
 Ravate
 Shironde
 Savare
 Shelkar
 Sumda
 Sagane
 Surum
 Sambre
 Talhe
 Tandel
 Tambade
 Tilivada
 Tope
 Umbarkar
 Wayade
 Wardha
 Warkhande
 Welpade
 Wangha
 Satav

Classification 
The Malhar Kolis are classified as Scheduled Tribe by the Government of Maharashtra. In some area, Malhar Kolis classified as an Other Backward Class (OBC) caste by the Government of Gujarat.

Notable people
Kaluram Dhodade, founder of Bhoomi Sena and politician from Praja Socialist Party

Notes

References 

Koli subcastes